Stakk Attakk is the debut album by the British glam metal band Wrathchild, released in June 1984.

Recorded at DJM Studio in London and mastered at Abbey Road, the album was engineered by Murray Harris and produced by former Magnum guitarist Robin George, in addition to him contributing guitar work, drum programming and background vocals.

The lead single from the album was "Alrite with the Boyz", a cover of Gary Glitter's 1975 single "Doing Alright with the Boys".

Track listing 
All songs written and composed by Wrathchild, except where indicated.
Side one
 "Stakk Attakk" - 4:32
 "Too Wild to Tame" - 3:18
 "Trash Queen" - 3:13
 "Shokker" - 4:07
 "Kick Down the Walls" - 4:05

Side two
 "Alrite with the Boyz" (Gary Glitter, Mike Leander) - 3:39
 "Sweet Surrender" - 4:09
 "Law Abuzer" - 4:11
 "Tonite" - 4:16
 "Wreckless" - 4:49

Personnel
Wrathchild
 Rocky Shades - vocals
 Lance Rocket - guitar
 Marc Angel - bass
 Eddie Starr - drums

Additional musicians
Robin George - guitar synthesizer, drum programming, backing vocals

Production
Robin George - producer
Mark Fishlock, Murray Harris - engineers

References

1984 debut albums
Wrathchild albums